Starksia springeri, the Springer's blenny, is a species of labrisomid blenny endemic to the waters around Curaçao where it is found at depths of from . It was originally known as Starksia atlantica, and is also closely related to Starksia sangreyae. The species is named after Victor G. Springer, a scientist from Smithsonian Institution.

References

springeri
Fish described in 2011